The Video Content Protection System (VCPS) is a standard for digital rights management, intended to enforce protection or DVD+R/+RW content and related media.
It was designed to protect video recordings broadcast terrestrially with the broadcast flag used for
digital high-definition programming, but its use has been expanded to 
cover programming obtained in other ways, such as via cable and satellite delivery. This standard is promoted by Philips and is included in latest Scsi MMC-6 specification.

The system makes use of three different classes of encryption key, one type stored on the media
in a  "Disc Key Block", one stored in player software, and one in any hardware device
that will be used to play (and hence decrypt) the media.

HP and Phillips Proposal 
There is a new Digital Rights Management scheme that could possibly make current DVD players obsolete. Hewlett-Packard and Philips have "discussed how they are trying to develop a content-protection system for DVDs, designed to protect users from burning 'protected' DTV broadcasts.” Once this new scheme is used, normal DVD and DVD players will no longer be able to read the new DVD systems. This new initiative is trying to prevent people from uploading illegal videos and recording TV shows illegally. In other words, this would prevent us from recording TV shows or movies that are played from the TV. This scheme will also be built into new media which will replace the non-DRM encoded DVD+R discs.

However, there are some problems that arise with this new system. These discs and DVD players will cost more than the non-DRM encoded ones. People will not want to buy this new system because it costs more than the universal systems that work with all players and with all forms of DVDs. Another problem with this new DRM system is that this format is no longer compatible with all DVD players and disc readers. This caused more trouble because users needed to own the specific reader in order to play the disc. This scheme was usurped by the emergence of buying movies online. Thus far, this scheme has not been implemented. If it was implemented then it would not be able to become a universal technology that everyone can use.

References

External links
 Philips VCPS page, includes VCPS specification
 SCSI MultiMedia Command Set - 6 (MMC-6), includes VCPS-specific commands

Compact Disc and DVD copy protection
Digital rights management standards
High-definition television
Philips